Tom & Jerry is 1995 Indian Malayalam-language comedy film directed by Kaladharan. The film stars Mukesh, Jagadish, Annie Shaji Kailas, and Jagathy Sreekumar.

Plot
The film tells the story about two men, who searches for his father whom he has never met; they meet and help a little girl escape from her identity stealing con-artist Aunt Balagopalan in order to find her lost (and presumed dead) father who was actually murdered by Chandrasekharna Varma.

Cast

References

External links
 

1990s Malayalam-language films
1990s crime comedy films
Indian crime comedy films
1995 films
1995 comedy films
Films directed by Kaladharan